The .17 Remington is a rifle cartridge introduced in 1971 by Remington Arms Company for their model 700 rifles.

Overview
The .17 Remington is based on the .223 Remington case necked down to .172 in (4.37 mm), with the shoulder moved back.

Extremely high initial velocity (over 4,000 ft/s 1,200 m/s), flat trajectory and very low recoil are the .17 Remington's primary attributes.

The smaller .172 bullet typically has a much lower ballistic coefficient than other typical varmint calibers, such as that of the .223 Remington. Because of this, the .172 bullet loses velocity slightly sooner and is more sensitive to wind; but by no means does this render the cartridge useless. The tiny entrance wound and usual lack of exit wound on coyote-sized animals make it an ideal round for fur bearing animals from which the hunter intends to collect a pelt. A significant disadvantage is the rapid rate at which such a small-caliber rifle barrel can accumulate gilding metal fouling, which is very detrimental to accuracy and may also eventually result in increasing pressures caused by the fouling's constriction of the bore. Many .17 Remington shooters have reported optimum accuracy when the bore is cleaned after every 10 - 20 shots, though more modern metallurgy used in both barrels and bullets has largely mitigated the fouling issue.

The .17 Remington is also one of the few cartridges in which powder charge weight is often greater than bullet weight. Though this condition has been known to degrade accuracy, the .17 Remington is noted for exceptional accuracy.

Dimensions

Gallery

See also
 4 mm caliber
 .17 Ackley Bee
 .17 Hornet
 .17 Remington Fireball
 Delta L problem
 List of rifle cartridges
 Sectional density
 Table of handgun and rifle cartridges

References

External links

 Wildcatting: 17 Remington
 .17 Remington Versus .22-250
 .17 Remington cartridge review
 The .17 Remington by Chuck Hawks
 Life before .22: the .17 HMR is a wimp-try the .17 Remington or the .19 Calhoon.
 

Pistol and rifle cartridges
Remington Arms cartridges